Third-seeded Vivian McGrath defeated John Bromwich 6–3, 1–6, 6–0, 2–6, 6–1 in the final to win the men's singles tennis title at the 1937 Australian Championships.

Seeds
The seeded players are listed below. Vivian McGrath is the champion; others show the round in which they were eliminated.

 Jack Crawford (semifinals)
 Adrian Quist (quarterfinals)
 Vivian McGrath (champion)
 John Bromwich (finalist)
 Don Turnbull (quarterfinals)
 Abel Kay (quarterfinals)
 Harry Hopman (semifinals)
 Len Schwartz (quarterfinals)

Draw

Key
 Q = Qualifier
 WC = Wild card
 LL = Lucky loser
 r = Retired

Finals

Earlier rounds

Section 1

Section 2

External links
 

1937 in Australian tennis
1937
Men's Singles